Newtowne Neck State Park is a public recreation area located  southwest of Leonardtown in St. Mary's County, Maryland. The state park sits on a peninsula that is surrounded by Breton Bay, St. Clements Bay, and the Potomac River. It is managed by the  Maryland Department of Natural Resources.

History

The park was part of the state's purchase of former Jesuit holdings in Southern Maryland in 2009. The discovery of military ordnance on the site forced the park to close in 2012. It reopened to the public in 2014.

Activities and amenities
The state park offers  of undeveloped shoreline, fishing, hunting, unimproved hiking and biking trails, and kayaking.

References

External links
Newtowne Neck State Park Maryland Department of Natural Resources

State parks of Maryland
Parks in St. Mary's County, Maryland
Protected areas established in 2009
2009 establishments in Maryland
Leonardtown, Maryland